Rottum may refer to any of the following places: 

Rottum (island group), a small group of islands in the Netherlands, part of the West Frisian Islands
Rottumeroog, a West Frisian island formerly called Rottum
Rottum, Groningen, a village in province of Groningen, in the Netherlands
Rottum, Friesland, a village in the province of Friesland, in the Netherlands
Steinhausen an der Rottum, a village in Germany, in the district Biberach, part of the Steinhausen municipality
Rottum (river), a river of Baden-Württemberg, Germany, running through the city of Laupheim